The 2017 New Zealand Radio Awards were the awards for excellence in the New Zealand radio industry during 2016. It was the 40th New Zealand Radio Awards, recognising staff, volunteers and contractors in both commercial and non-commercial broadcasting.

Winners and nominees

This is a list of nominees, with winners in bold.

Associated Craft Award

Best Children's Programme

Best Community Access Programmes

Best Community Campaign

Best Content

Best Maori Language Broadcast

Best New Broadcaster

Best News & Sport

Best On Air

Best Promotion

Best Radio Creative

Best Spoken Programmes

Best Technical Production

Sales Team of the Year

Station of the Year

'The Blackie' (Award)

Outstanding Contribution to Radio

Services to Broadcasting

References

New Zealand Radio Awards